Emilio Sánchez was the defending champion, but finished runner-up this year.

Karel Nováček won the tournament, beating Sánchez in the final, 6–2, 6–4.

Seeds

  Kent Carlsson (first round)
  Emilio Sánchez (final)
  Andrei Chesnokov (quarterfinals)
  Horst Skoff (quarterfinals)
  Paolo Canè (semifinals)
 N/A
  Javier Sánchez (second round)
  Karel Nováček (champion)

Draw

Finals

Top half

Bottom half

External links
 ATP main draw

Singles